"Boat on the River" is a 1979 song by Styx, from their album Cornerstone. It was released as a single in 1980 in various countries, but not in the band's native United States, where "Borrowed Time" was released instead. 

It was popular in several European countries, becoming a top-five hit on the German, Austrian and Swiss charts (reaching number one on the latter).

Background
The song features Tommy Shaw on lead vocals and mandolin, with Dennis DeYoung accompanying on accordion and harmony vocals. In the video for the song, Chuck Panozzo, John Panozzo, and James J.Y. Young play bowed double bass, tambourine/bass drum and acoustic guitar respectively (even though James J.Y. Young does not play on the original recording).

Shaw said of writing the song:

But Shaw decided to demonstrate the composition to the band and, according to Shaw, "Dennis liked it enough and said, 'Let’s put it on the album.' That’s one thing I like about being a band that’s been so daring over the years: you get to try stuff like that!"

Reception
Allmusic reviewer Mike DeGagne praised both "Boat on the River" and fellow Cornerstone single "Lights" for their "silky harmonies and welcoming choruses".  Canadian Press critic Michael Lawson said it has a "Russian folksong flavor" and called it a "showcase for Shaw's balalaika-like mandolin work"  The Pittsburgh Press critic Pete Bishop called it a "zippy Mediterranean-style dance on which Tommy Shaw stars on mandolin" and "a fine novelty number."  Eric Hegedus of The Morning Call said that the song "charts a new course for Styx" and that "the mandolin and autoharp, both played by Shaw, lend a tranquil Venetian air to the song; you can actually picture yourself floating down a canal in a gondola."  On the other hand, Wichita Beacon reviewer Terre Johnson felt that Styx should not have tried a folk song, saying that "it muddles about with a folksy sound without building into anything close to the magnitude, intensity or emotion in the other songs [on Cornerstone].  

Classic Rock critic Malcolm Dome rated "Boat on the River" as Styx 8th greatest song, saying that Shaw's mandolin and DeYoung's accordion give the song a "somewhat expressive European flavour, which makes it more than just another power ballad." PopMatters critic David Pike rated it one of the "41 essential pop/rock songs with accordion."

Cover versions
The song has been covered by Seventh Avenue, Guano Apes, and Finland's Riki Sorsa. The song has also been covered by Turkish artist Metin Özülkü, German folk rock band Fiddler's Green and by Bulgarian singer Mimi Ivanova.

The 1994 Slovenian song "Mlinar na Muri", which immediately became hit and eventually evergreen, with new lyrics by Tomaž Domicelj, sampled the melody of this tune.

Track listings 
7" Single

 Boat on the River – 3:10
 Borrowed Time – 4:58

Personnel
Tommy Shaw - lead vocals, mandolin, acoustic guitar, autoharp
Dennis DeYoung - accordion, harmony vocals
Chuck Panozzo - double bass
John Panozzo - tambourine/bass drum

Charts

References

1979 songs
1980 singles
Styx (band) songs
American folk songs
A&M Records singles
Number-one singles in Switzerland
Songs written by Tommy Shaw